is a railway station in the city of Nikkō, Tochigi Prefecture, Japan, operated by the third-sector railway company Watarase Keikoku Railway.

Lines

Station layout
The station has a two opposed side platforms connected to the station building by a level crossing.

Platforms

Adjacent stations

History
Ashio Station opened on 31 December 1912 as a station on the Ashio Railway. In 2009, many of the structures of Ashio Station were granted protection as national Registered Tangible Cultural Properties. These include the station building and adjacent platform, the opposing platform, Baggage Storage Shed Dangerous Goods Shed  and Freight Depot with freight platform.

Surrounding area
Ashio Copper Mine

See also
 List of railway stations in Japan

References

External links

  Station information (Watarase Keikoku) 

Railway stations in Tochigi Prefecture
Railway stations in Japan opened in 1912
Nikkō, Tochigi
Registered Tangible Cultural Properties